Shaun Dion Hamilton (born September 11, 1995) is an American football coach and former linebacker who is the assistant linebackers coach for the Detroit Lions of the National Football League (NFL). He played college football at Alabama and was drafted by the Washington Redskins in the sixth round of the 2018 NFL Draft.

Professional career

Washington Redskins / Football Team

Hamilton was drafted by the Washington Redskins in the sixth round (197th overall pick) of the 2018 NFL Draft. On May 10, 2018, he signed his rookie contract. Hamilton recorded his first career interception against the quarterback Josh Rosen in Week 6 win against the Miami Dolphins in the 2019 season. After Week 15 of the 2020 season, Hamilton was placed on injured reserve on December 21, 2020. Hamilton was waived on January 11, 2021.

Detroit Lions
On January 12, 2021, Hamilton was claimed off waivers by the Detroit Lions. He was placed on injured reserve on August 17, 2021.

On March 14, 2022, Hamilton re-signed with the Lions. He was released on August 23, 2022.

Coaching career
After his release from Detroit, on September 7, 2022, Hamilton retired from playing to pursue a coaching career, joining the Lions coaching staff as a defensive assistant. On February 8, 2023, Hamilton accepted a role as an assistant linebackers coach with the same team.

References

External links
Detroit Lions bio
Alabama Crimson Tide bio

1995 births
Living people
Players of American football from Montgomery, Alabama
American football linebackers
Alabama Crimson Tide football players
Washington Redskins players
Washington Football Team players
Detroit Lions players
Detroit Lions coaches